Johnson Motor Wheel was a kit to convert a bicycle into a motorized bicycle. It was manufactured by an American firm, Johnson Brothers Motor Company in Terre Haute, Indiana.

History
The Johnson Motor Wheel was designed in 1914 by Louis Johnson. It was patented in the USA in 1919 and in the UK in 1920.
The initial design had problems at high speeds, so a fellow inventor from Indiana, Dick Oglesby, offered his ignition magnetos to the Johnsons in order to address the problem. The Johnson brothers moved to South Bend, Indiana, and formed the Johnson Brothers Motor Wheel Company to manufacture the kits.

The Motor Wheel had a 2 cycle engine which produced 1HP and had two flywheel magnetos, bronze bearings and a float feed carburetor. The complete kit came with a wheel, hub tire, shock-absorbing spring sprocket holder, wheel sprocket and chain, handlebar controls for choke, throttle and engine shutoff, three quart gas tank and gas line, and all necessary fittings to adapt the engine and rear wheel unit to any 26" bicycle.

See also
Timeline of motorized bicycle history
List of motorcycles of the 1910s
List of motorcycle manufacturers
Motorized bicycle

References

External links 
 Johnson Motor Wheel
 Gas Engine Magazine
 U.S. Scooter Museum

Motorized bicycles
Defunct motorcycle manufacturers of the United States
Vehicle manufacturing companies established in 1914